The Witterings is an electoral division of West Sussex in the United Kingdom, and returns one member to sit on West Sussex County Council.

Extent
The division covers the villages of Almodington, Birdham, Bracklesham, Earnley, East Wittering, Shipton Green, Somerley, West Itchenor and West Wittering.

It comprises the following Chichester District wards: East Wittering Ward and West Wittering Ward; and of the following civil parishes: Birdham, Earnley, East Wittering, West Itchenor and West Wittering.

Election results

2013 Election
Results of the election held on 2 May 2013:

2009 Election
Results of the election held on 4 June 2009:

2005 Election
Results of the election held on 5 May 2005:

References
Election Results - West Sussex County Council

External links
 West Sussex County Council
 Election Maps

Electoral Divisions of West Sussex